"This Boy's in Love" is a song by Australian electronic duo The Presets. It is the second single from their 2008 album Apocalypso.

Music video
The music video for "This Boy's in Love" was directed by Danish photographer Casper Balslev. The video filming took over two days. It depicts the band singing and playing in dust and dirty air, and two semi-naked fighters wrestling in milk.

Charts

Weekly charts

Year-end charts

Certification

Track listings

CD single
 "This Boy's in Love"
 "This Boy's in Love" (Lifelike Remix)
 "This Boy's in Love" (Jori Hulkkonen Remix)

iTunes EP
 "This Boy's in Love"
 "This Boy's in Love" (Zombie Nation Remix)
 "This Boy's in Love" (K.I.M Edit)
 "Are You the One?" (Lifelike's 1 Serious Remix)

iTunes EP
 "This Boy's in Love"
 "This Boy's in Love" (Lifelike Remix)
 "This Boy's in Love" (Jori Hulkkonen Remix)

12" vinyl
 "This Boy's in Love"
 "This Boy's in Love" (K.I.M. Edit)
 "This Boy's in Love" (Lifelike Remix)

12" vinyl
 "This Boy's in Love" (Jori Hulkkonen Remix)
 "This Boy's in Love" (Zombie Nation Remix)
 "This Boy's in Love" (Kevin Saunderson Remix)

7" vinyl
 "This Boy's in Love"
 "Buzz Factory"

References

External links
 

2008 singles
The Presets songs
Songs written by Julian Hamilton
Songs written by Kim Moyes
Modular Recordings singles
2007 songs